Cam Loch (the crooked loch) is an irregularly-shaped freshwater loch, about 5 km long, on a north-west to south-east orientation, located slightly north of the village of Elphin, in the Assynt district of Sutherland, Scotland. The loch is located in an area along with neighbouring Coigach, as the Assynt-Coigach National Scenic Area, one of 40 such areas in Scotland.

Geography
Located immediately to the south-west of Cam Loch, and at a slightly lower level, is Loch Veyatie, which is roughly parallel to it. The two lochs are connected by Abhainn Mhòr, which consists of extensions of the two lochs with a waterfall between them. It is an area that holds several large lochs, for example the irregular-shaped Loch Sionascaig, directly to the west. The loch is overlooked by the twin peaks of Cùl Mòr at 849m to the south-west. Directly south of the loch is Canisp at 847m. To the south-east, is the steep-sides ridge that forms the mountain of Suilven at 723m. Cam Loch sits in an area of wilderness landscape of moorland, bogs, and lochs and lochans. 

Cam Loch is fed by inflows from Loch Urigill and Loch Borralan via the River Ledbeg. The loch drains via Abhainn Mhòr, into Loch Veyatie, that is part of the Fionn Loch Drainage System, that drains into Fionn Loch, that in turn is drained by the River Kirkaig into the sea.

Interglacial site
Cam Loch is internationally important as one of the most intensively studied late glacial sites in Scotland, in studies by members of the Freshwater Biological Association. It is a reference site for the stratigraphy of the late glacial in north-west Scotland and used to compare paleoecological research with sites elsewhere in the United Kingdom and Western Europe. The sediments preserved on the loch bed are important for reconstructing the late glacial period between 13000 and 10000 BP. The evidence provided by the sediment shows a rapid and marked climatic change during that period. Due to richness of the evidence, the loch has been intensively studied over the years. The sediments have been studied for their inorganic and organic geochemistry, pollen stratigraphy and diatom stratigraphy.

Bibliography

Inorganic geochemistry

Organic geochemistry

Pollen stratigraphy

Diatom stratigraphy

Gallery

References

Freshwater lochs of Scotland
Kirkaig Basin
Sites of Special Scientific Interest in Scotland